Tyler Harlton (born January 11, 1976) is a Canadian former professional ice hockey defenceman. He was selected by the St. Louis Blues in the fourth round (94th overall) of the 1994 NHL Entry Draft.

Harlton played 213 games in the American Hockey League where he scored 9 goals and 29 assists for 38 points, while earning 203 penalty minutes, in 213 games played.

Career statistics

Awards and honours

References

External links

Living people
1976 births
Austin Ice Bats players
Canadian ice hockey defencemen
Houston Aeros (1994–2013) players
Michigan State Spartans men's ice hockey players
Peoria Rivermen (ECHL) players
Saint Mary's University (Halifax) alumni
St. John's Maple Leafs players
St. Louis Blues draft picks
Vernon Lakers players
Worcester IceCats players
AHCA Division I men's ice hockey All-Americans